Fučík is a Czech surname. Notable people with the surname include:

Julius Fučík (disambiguation), multiple people
Tomáš Fučík (born 1985), Czech swimmer
Renáta Fučíková (born 1964), Czech book illustrator, artist and author of children's books

See also
Mount Fučík, mountain of Antarctica
Bernhard Fucik (born 1990), Austrian footballer
2345 Fučik, main-belt asteroid

Czech-language surnames